Yi Sun-sin Bridge (Hangul: 이순신대교; Hanja: 李舜臣大橋) is a suspension bridge in the south coast of South Korea. The bridge is one part of The Approach Road to Yeosu Industrial Complex. It is the world's eighth longest suspension bridge in terms of its main span length of 1,545 m since it opened in 2012. The bridge connects Gwangyang with Myodo-dong, a small island that is part of Yeosu City.

Yi Sun-sin was a Korean Admiral who was born in 1545 and built the world first ironclad warship called 'the Turtle ship' and defended the country against Japanese navy in the Joseon Dynasty. The bridge was designed by Yooshin Engineering Corporation and was constructed by Daelim Industrial Company.

Unlike the previous suspension bridges in Korea, Daelim's engineers carried out the whole construction engineering by themselves despite its outstanding scale compared with the former ones.

The bridge was a finalist in the Outstanding Structure Award 2013.

References

See also
 Transportation in South Korea
 List of bridges in South Korea

Suspension bridges in South Korea
Bridges completed in 2012
Road bridges